The 2022–23 Wessex Football League season is the 37th in the history of the Wessex Football League since its establishment in 1986. The league consists of two divisions: the Premier Division and Division One.

The constitution was announced on 12 May 2022.

Premier Division
The Premier Division was reduced from 21 clubs to 20, after Bashley and Hamworthy United were promoted to the Southern League South Division; Alton were transferred to the Combined Counties League, and Amesbury Town were relegated to Division One.

Three new teams joined the division:
Two promoted from Division One:
Bemerton Heath Harlequins
Laverstock & Ford
One transferred from Southern Combination League Premier Division:
Pagham

League table

Division One
Division One remained at 20 clubs after Bemerton Heath Harlequins and Laverstock & Ford were promoted to the Premier Division, and Infinity resigned from the league during last season.

Three new teams joined the division:
One relegated from the Premier Division:
Amesbury Town
One promoted from the Hampshire Premier League:
Fleetlands
One promoted from the Dorset Premier League:
Hamworthy Recreation

League table

References

External links
 Wessex Football League official site

Wessex Football League seasons
9